Maple Leaf Cement is a Pakistani building materials company which is owned by United Venture Holdings. 

It is one of the largest Pakistani cement manufacturer and is based in Lahore, Pakistan.

In 1992, Saigol Group acquired the company under the privatization scheme from the Government of Pakistan Pakistan.

References

Saigol Group
Cement companies of Pakistan
Manufacturing companies established in 1956
Pakistani brands
Manufacturing companies based in Lahore
Companies listed on the Pakistan Stock Exchange
Formerly government-owned companies of Pakistan
Pakistani companies established in 1956